Neolema is a genus of leaf beetles in the family Chrysomelidae. Eight described species currently are placed in Neolema.

Species
Neolema cordata R. White, 1993
Neolema dorsalis (Olivier, 1791)
Neolema ephippium (Lacordaire, 1845)
Neolema gundlachiana (Suffrian, 1874)
Neolema jacobina (Linell, 1897)
Neolema ovalis R. White, 1993
Neolema quadriguttata R. White, 1993
Neolema sexpunctata (Olivier, 1808) (six-spotted neolema)

References

Further reading

 Arnett, R. H. Jr., M. C. Thomas, P. E. Skelley and J. H. Frank. (eds.). (21 June 2002). American Beetles, Volume II: Polyphaga: Scarabaeoidea through Curculionoidea. CRC Press LLC, Boca Raton, Florida .
 Arnett, Ross H. (2000). American Insects: A Handbook of the Insects of America North of Mexico. CRC Press.
 Richard E. White. (1983). Peterson Field Guides: Beetles. Houghton Mifflin Company.
 Riley, Edward G., Shawn M. Clark, and Terry N. Seeno (2003). "Catalog of the leaf beetles of America north of Mexico (Coleoptera: Megalopodidae, Orsodacnidae and Chrysomelidae, excluding Bruchinae)". Coleopterists Society Special Publication no. 1, 290.
 White, Richard E. (1968). A Review of the Genus Cryptocephalus in America North of Mexico. Smithsonian Institution Press.

Criocerinae